Shilpa is an Indian feminine given name which means "sculpture", "statue" and "work of art".

Notable people with the given name Shilpa Jain
 Shilpa Anand (born 1982), Indian actress and model
 Shilpa Raju (born 1992), Indian singer
 Shilpa Rao (born 1984), Indian singer
 Shilpa Ray, American singer-songwriter
 Shilpa Saklani (born 1962), Indian actress
 Shilpa Shetty (born 1975), Indian actress and model
 Shilpa Shinde (born 1967), Indian actress
 Shilpa Shirodkar (born 1973), Indian actress
 Shilpa Shukla (born 1982), Indian actress
 Shilpa Singh (born 1990), Indian beauty pageant winner
 Shilpa Tulaskar (born 1957), Indian actress

Notable people with the given name Silpa 
 Silpa Bhirasri (1892–1962), Italian-Thai sculptor

Notable people with the surname Silpa 
 Mitch Silpa (born 1973), American writer, actor and director

Hindu given names
Indian feminine given names